Ars, or Arsim (the plural in Hebrew) is a derogatory Hebrew slang term derived from the Arabic word for pimp. It is usually used to denote a certain ethnic stereotype: low-class men of Mizrahi origin who associate with a certain macho subculture. An ars is typically crude, uses vulgar language, hangs out with criminal types and wears flashy clothing and jewelry.

Etymology 
The origin of the term is from Arabic word Ars – which means shepherd, and is used colloquially to refer to pimps (who "shepherd" prostitutes).

History
While ars originated as a derogatory term for Mizrahim, it is also used for members of other ethnicities in Israeli society, such as Russian-speaking immigrants or young men of Ethiopian origin. 

In 2013, an Israeli labor court ruled that a prospective employer discriminated against a Mizrahi applicant by calling him an ars. This case set the precedent for recognizing the term ars as a racial epithet.

In 2014, a documentary series called Arsim uFrekhot (frekha is a feminine equivalent epithet aimed at Mizrahi women) was broadcast on Israeli television. The series examines the history of discrimination against Mizrahim and the social norms of white privilege versus Mizrahi marginalization as they appear in Israeli society.

The mannerisms associated with pimps in the early days of the State of Israel, which formed the basis of the stereotypical ars: lack of education, associating with criminals, being prone to violence, hailing from low class neighborhoods, dressing in loud clothing,  wearing gold chain necklaces or bracelets and using vulgar speech. Related terms used by the Ashkenazi majority were  "pushtak" (vacuous) and "tchakh-chakh" (riffraff).

Sometimes the word ars is "feminized" by adding a feminine suffix (arsit), although it is not commonly used for women. The word frekha is the closest feminine epithet that is applied to Mizrahi women. A "frekha" is the implied partner, neighbor, or relative of the ars, but the characteristics ascribed to her are different – the frekha is low-class, dresses gaudily, wears too much makeup, has long and brightly colored nails; she is flighty, shallow, a slave to fashion, and uneducated.

See also 
Maroco sakin
Jojo Khalastra
 Chav
 Gopnik
 Guido (slang)
Greaser

References

Arabic words and phrases
Class-related slurs
Hebrew slang
Mizrahi Jewish culture in Israel
Ethnic and religious slurs
Racism in Israel
Slang terms for men
Stereotypes of working-class men
Working class in Asia